John Hope (28 May 1866 – 29 March 1950) was a New Zealand cricketer. He played 22 first-class matches for Otago between 1885 and 1900.

See also
 List of Otago representative cricketers

References

External links
 

1866 births
1950 deaths
New Zealand cricketers
Otago cricketers
Cricketers from Dunedin